Annika Qarlsson (born 1964) is a Swedish Centre Party politician. She has been a member of the Riksdag since 2002.

External links
Annika Qarlsson at the Riksdag website

1964 births
21st-century Swedish women politicians
Living people
Members of the Riksdag 2002–2006
Members of the Riksdag 2006–2010
Members of the Riksdag 2010–2014
Members of the Riksdag 2014–2018
Members of the Riksdag 2018–2022
Members of the Riksdag from the Centre Party (Sweden)
Women members of the Riksdag